Nicole Flint (born 15 May 1988) is a South African-American model, radio and TV presenter and public relations professional from Pretoria who was crowned Miss South Africa 2009.

Pageantry

Miss Teen USA 2007
Flint won Miss Indiana Teen USA 2007 and she represent Indiana at Miss Teen USA 2007 but she was unplaced.

Miss Universe 2010
Flint placed in the Top 10 at the Miss Universe 2010 pageant held on 23 August 2010, in Las Vegas, Nevada.

Miss World 2010
Flint placed in the top 20 in Miss World 2010, the 60th Miss World pageant, which was held on 30 October 2010.

References

External links
 Nicole Flint's Online Diary
Nicole Flint at IMDb

      

1988 births
Living people
Miss South Africa winners
2007 beauty pageant contestants
21st-century Miss Teen USA delegates
Miss Universe 2010 contestants
Miss World 2010 delegates
People from Anderson, Indiana
People from Pretoria
American people of British descent
American people of South African descent
Female models from Indiana
South African female models
White South African people
South African people of American descent
South African people of British descent